Krutoyak is a rural locality (a village) in Bereznikovskoye Rural Settlement, Sobinsky District, Vladimir Oblast, Russia. The population was 77 as of 2010.

Geography 
Krutoyak is located on the Klyazma River, 8 km southwest of Sobinka (the district's administrative centre) by road. Perebor is the nearest rural locality.

References 

Rural localities in Sobinsky District